Ian McDougall  (born  14 June 1938) is a Canadian jazz musician who played lead trombone for Rob McConnell and the Boss Brass.

Life and career 
McDougall was born in Calgary, and grew up in Victoria. At the age of 11, he joined the Victoria Boy’s Band, wanting to be a drummer.  Disappointed at not playing a full drum kit, he thought he'd like to try trumpet instead, but his father intervened: "Play the trombone, son, because a good trombone player is never out of work." Starting at the age of 13, he started playing at venues around Victoria.

McDougall left Victoria in 1960 to tour in Great Britain with the John Dankworth Band.
  He returned to Vancouver in 1962, was a freelance player, and played with the Vancouver Symphony Orchestra and at the Cave Supper Club, under the leadership of Fraser MacPherson. 
He began studying at the University of British Columbia, earning Bachelor of Music (1966), and Master of Music (1970).

In 1970 he co-founded the fusion group Pacific Salt, with five of Vancouver's premier jazz musicians: guitarist Oliver Gannon, Don Clark (trumpet), Ron Johnston (piano), Tony Clitheroe (bass, bass guitar), and George Ursan (drums).  Pacific Salt recorded three LPs, and was inactive by the early 1980s.
Pacific Salt bandmates McDougall, Gannon, and Johnston recorded in 1976 and 1988 and in 1990 toured the Canadian festival circuit under the name R.I.O., initials from each of their given names.  McDougall reunited with Gannon and Johnston to perform as R.I.O in 2014.

In 1973 he and his wife, violinist Barbara McDougall moved East to Toronto and began a studio career.  Rob McConnell founder of The Boss Brass, invited him to join the group, and he became a featured soloist, playing with the group until 1991.

McDougall was a founding member, soloist, lead trombone, and arranger for Doug Hamilton's The Brass Connection.

McDougall has composed and arranged classical music, with commissions from the Canadian Broadcasting Corporation, and the Vancouver and Toronto Symphony orchestras.

Some of his music for brass is published by Cherry Classics Music.

Musical educator 

A sessional instructor 1986-8 at the University of British Columbia, in 1988 he was invited to teach trombone, jazz studies, and orchestration at the University of Victoria in 1988, retiring as Professor Emeritus in 2003.

Awards and nominations 
In April 2008, McDougall was appointed as a Member of the Order of Canada.

During his time with Rob McConnell and the Boss Brass (1973 - 1991), the group was nominated nine times and received four Juno Awards.
The Boss Brass album All In Good Time won the Grammy Award for Best Jazz Instrumental Performance, Big Band category in 1983, the album The Brass is Back was nominated in 1992.
The Brass Connection won a Juno for their eponymous album in 1982, and were nominated again in 1984 for A New Look 
The album Live Jazz Legends with Oliver Jones, PJ Perry, Terry Clarke, and Michele Donato was nominated in 2008.
As leader, Ian McDougall has had three albums nominated for the Juno: Best Traditional Jazz Album, In A Sentimental Mood (2006), Instrumental Album of the Year The Very Thought Of You (2013),  and Traditional Jazz Album, The Ian McDougall 12tet Live (2014).

Discography

As leader
 The Warmth of the Horn (Concord Jazz, 1994)
 Songs & Arias (Ian McDougall, 1997)
 Nights in Vancouver (Cellar Live, 2004)
 In a Sentimental Mood (Barbarian, 2005)
 No Passport Required (Barbarian, 2007)
 Burnin' the House Down (Barbarian, 2008)
 Dry With a Twist (Ian McDougall, 2008)
 12-Tet Live (Barbarian, 2012)
 Very Thought of You (CD Baby, 2012)

As featured soloist
 Time to Wait, Art Ellefson Sextet, featuring Ian McDougall and Kenny Wheeler, (Jazz Modus)
 In the Tradition, Fraser MacPherson Quintet featuring Ian McDougall (Concord Jazz)
 Vancouver, (Justin Time)
 Night Flight, Sammy Nestico Big Band

With Rob McConnell and the Boss Brass
 Brassy and Sassy, (Concord Jazz)
 The Brass is Back, (Concord Jazz)
 The Boss Brass Again, (UMB)
 The Boss Brass Live in Digital
 Tribute, (Pausa)
 Nobody Does it Better, (Phonodisc)
 Atras Da Porta, (Innovation)
 Boss Brass and Woods, (Innovation)
 The Best Damn Band in the Land 
 Big Band Jazz, (UMB)
 The Jazz Album, (Attic)
 Present Perfect, (MPS)
 All in Good Time
 The Singers Unlimited with Rob McConnell and the Boss Brass, (MPS)

With the Brass Connection
 A 5 Star Edition, featuring Ian McDougall, Carl Fontana, Bill Watrous, and Jiggs Wigham
 A New Look (Innovation) re-released as Standards (Jazz Alliance)
 The Brass Connection, (Innovation)

With the Canadian Broadcasting Corporation
 Concerto for Clarinet and Strings, on Clarinet Concerti
 Three Canadian Folksongs, for the Vancouver Chamber Choir, on Simple Gifts
 Entre Amis, Canadian and American music for Chamber Orchestra, the Andante from the Clarinet Concerto

See also 

Music of Canada

References

External links 
 

1938 births
Living people
Musicians from Calgary
Canadian trombonists
Male trombonists
Canadian composers
Canadian male composers
University of British Columbia alumni
Academic staff of the University of Victoria
Members of the Order of Canada
21st-century trombonists
21st-century Canadian male musicians